Cape Hallett is a snow-free area (Antarctic oasis) on the northern tip of the Hallett Peninsula on the Ross Sea coast of Victoria Land, East Antarctica.

History

In 1956, during Operation Deep Freeze II,  was damaged by an ice floe at Cape Hallett.

Hallett Station

The cape was the location of a joint scientific base, Hallett Station, between the United States and New Zealand during the International Geophysical Year of 1957, and was manned permanently until 1964, when there was a major fire.  It was then used as a summer only base until 1973.  The site is currently being remediated by removing hazardous materials: fuel, and oil stored in several large tanks.  This is an ongoing project which will take several years to complete.

Antarctic Specially Protected Area
An area of 74 ha is protected under the Antarctic Treaty System as Antarctic Specially Protected Area (ASPA) No.106 because it contains habitats with a rich and diverse range of plant communities that are the most extensive and representative examples known at the northern end of the latitudinal gradient of Victoria Land and the Ross Sea.  Surveys have recorded 18 species of lichens and five species of mosses, dominated by Bryum subrotundifolium.  Animals found at the site include, as well as four species of mites and three of springtails, breeding colonies of south polar skuas and Adélie penguins.

Adélie penguin colony
A large Adélie penguin colony occupies Seabee Hook, on the west side of Hallett Peninsula between Moubray Bay and Edisto Inlet.  The history of human impact on the colony through the occupation of Hallett Station, and the subsequent closure of the station, together with the availability of reliable historical data on colony population size, make the site unique and ideal for the study of impacts on, and recovery of, the colony after substantial ecosystem disturbance.

See also
 List of Antarctic field camps
Brockton Station
Byrd Station
Ellsworth Station
Little America V
McMurdo Station
Operation Deep Freeze
Palmer Station
Plateau Station
Siple Station
South Pole Station

References

External links

Antarctica New Zealand Hallett Base and the environment page

Hallett, Cape
Borchgrevink Coast
Antarctic Specially Protected Areas
Seabird colonies
1956 establishments in Antarctica
1973 disestablishments in Antarctica
Penguin colonies